Noctueliopsis palmalis is a moth in the family Crambidae. It was described by William Barnes and James Halliday McDunnough in 1918. It is found in North America, where it has been recorded from California, Nevada and Texas. The habitat consists of high and low elevation deserts.

The length of the forewings is 6-8.5 mm. The forewings are brown with a reddish tinge. Adults are on wing from March to June.

References

Moths described in 1918
Odontiini